St Joseph's School (SJS) is a primary to secondary school in Abu Dhabi, United Arab Emirates and is next to St. Joseph's Cathedral, Abu Dhabi.

Overview 
The school was established in 1967 and is managed by the Apostolic Vicariate of the Roman Catholic Church to Arabia. After its establishment, the school was managed by Giovanni Bernardo Gremoli, afterward succeeded by Paul Hinder. The school, always associated with the Roman Catholic Church, was located initially in the church building on the Abu Dhabi Corniche. Following the decision of the local government that the site is altered, the present foundation was laid for church and school buildings on 19 March 1981, and dedicated to St Joseph, the foster father of Jesus Christ, whose feast-day is celebrated on the same day.

References

External links
 St. Joseph's School, Abu Dhabi
 St Joseph's Cathedral, Abu Dhabi

Educational institutions established in 1967
Schools in Abu Dhabi
Catholic schools in the United Arab Emirates
Schools in the Emirate of Abu Dhabi
International schools in the United Arab Emirates
1967 establishments in the Trucial States